Jane Oakley  (born 25 June 1966) is an Australian former footballer who played as a defender for the Australia women's national soccer team. She was part of the team at the 1994 OFC Women's Championship and 1995 FIFA Women's World Cup. At the club level, she played for Berwick City in Australia.

In 2004, she was inducted into the Australian Soccer Association Hall of Fame (HOF).
In 2012, she was inducted into the Football Federation Victoria Hall of Fame.

References

External links
 

1966 births
Living people
Australian women's soccer players
Australia women's international soccer players
Place of birth missing (living people)
1995 FIFA Women's World Cup players
Women's association football defenders
Recipients of the Australian Sports Medal